Tazweed Center is a chain of independently owned and operated hypermarkets operating in the Syrian refugee camps. The word "tazweed" translates as "resupply".

References

External links
Two hypermarkets offer Zaatari residents variety of foodstuff
Tazweed Website
A real market thrives in Zaatari camp
93 % نسبة تشغيل أهل المفرق في مركز (تزويد) 
افتتاح مركز تزويد للتسوق في مخيم الزعتري بالشراكة مع الغذاء العالمي

Retail companies established in 2013
Hypermarkets
Syrian refugee camps